Velma Pollard (born 1937) is a Jamaican poet and fiction writer. Among her most noteworthy works are Shame Trees Don't Grow Here (1991) and Leaving Traces (2007). She is known for the melodious and expressive mannerisms in her work. She is the sister of Erna Brodber.

Early life and education
Velma Pollard was born in 1937 to a farmer and school teacher in Woodside, Saint Mary Parish, Jamaica. Both Velma and her sister Erna expressed interest in the arts at a young age. Pollard attended Excelsior High School in Kingston, Jamaica. She went on to attend the University College of the West Indies, where she read languages. She has a Master's degree in English and Education from Columbia University and McGill University respectively.

Career

Her interest in writing began at an early age; at the age of seven, she won her first prize for a poem. It was not until 1975 that she became eager to have her work published. She sent her work to various journals, including the Jamaica Journal. Since 1988, her work has been published in several mediums, including The Women's Press and Canoe Press. She has published several anthologies and five poetry books. Her novel Karl won the Casa de las Americas literary prize in 1992. Since her retirement, Pollard has a continued presence at the University of West Indies as a senior lecturer.

Pollard extensively researched Creole languages of the English-official Caribbean. From this area of research, she found inspiration for her poetry. In August 2022, Pollard was elected as an honorary member of the Society for Caribbean Linguistics (SCL)   which she served with distinction as an SCL Executive Officer and SCL Financial Officer.

Works
Pollard's upbringing in a rural community has had a strong influence on her writing. Her work often features nostalgia of the countryside, and a strong philosophical tone. The way which she recites her work reflects the firmness and richness of her writing. Her poetry often reflects on modernity in contrast with the slower lifestyles of the past. In 2013, Pollard released a collection of poetry titled And Caret Bay Again: New and Selected Poems. This collection showcases her witty style of writing as well as her ability to maintain her audiences' interest.

References

Further reading
 Interview with Velma Pollard
 "Su Su" by Velma Pollard

1937 births
Living people
20th-century Jamaican poets
21st-century Jamaican poets
Jamaican women poets
20th-century Jamaican women writers
20th-century Jamaican novelists
21st-century Jamaican women writers
Jamaican women novelists
21st-century Jamaican novelists
People from Saint Mary Parish, Jamaica